Jan Švrček (born April 17, 1986) is a Czech professional ice hockey defenceman. He played with HC Sparta Prague in the Czech Extraliga during the 2010–11 Czech Extraliga season.

References

External links

1986 births
Czech ice hockey defencemen
PSG Berani Zlín players
Living people
Sportspeople from Přerov
LHK Jestřábi Prostějov players
HC Olomouc players
HC Kometa Brno players
Orli Znojmo players
HC Sparta Praha players